Sir William Randolph Douglas,  (24 September 1921 – 12 August 2003) was a Barbadian politician who served as Chief Justice of Barbados from 1965 to 1986, and twice served as the acting governor-general: from 9 August 1976 until 17 November 1976, and again from 10 January 1984 until 24 February 1984. Between 1987 and 1991, Douglas served as ambassador to the United States.

References

 

1921 births
2003 deaths
Governors-General of Barbados
Chief justices of Barbados
Ambassadors of Barbados to the United States
Colony of Barbados judges
Members of the Privy Council of the United Kingdom